Acerbis S.p.A. is an Italian sports gear manufacturer.

Sponsorship
The company is the sponsor of the Netherlands round of 2017 Superbike World Championship (as Acerbis Dutch Round), as well as the shirt manufacturer of Italian football clubs: AlbinoLeffe, and other teams.

In 2016 Superbike World Championship Acerbis  sponsored the United Kingdom round.

Sponsorship teams

Basketball 
 Blu Basket 1971
 Geas Basket
 Landstede Hammers

Cycling

Football

Futsal

Handball

National teams

Minifootball

National teams 
 Belgium

Rugby

National teams 
  (From 2021)

Club teams 
 Bergamo

Volleyball

Tennis

National teams

References

External links
 

Automotive companies of Italy
Sporting goods manufacturers of Italy
Sportswear brands